The 1973–74 Maltese First Division was the 59th season of top-tier football in Malta.  It was contested by 10 teams, and Valletta F.C. won the championship.

League standings

Relegation tie-breaker
With both Birkirkara and Qormi level on 14 points, a play-off match was conducted to Finish 9th place and be Relegated.

Results

References
Official table from Maltafootball.com 
Malta - List of final tables (RSSSF)

Maltese Premier League seasons
Malta
Premier